Damian Richard Eyre (born 8 October 1967) is a former English cricketer.  Eyre was a right-handed batsman who bowled slow left-arm orthodox.  He was born at Glossop, Derbyshire.

Eyre represented the Lancashire Cricket Board in List A cricket.  His debut List A match came against the Netherlands in the 1999 NatWest Trophy.  From 1999 to 2001, he represented the Board in 4 List A matches, the last of which came against the Yorkshire Cricket Board in the 2001 Cheltenham & Gloucester Trophy.  In his 4 List A matches, he took 3 wickets at a bowling average of 35.66, with best figures of 2/9.

Family
His father, John, played first-class cricket and List A cricket for Derbyshire.

References

External links
Damian Eyre at Cricinfo
Damian Eyre at CricketArchive

1967 births
Living people
People from Glossop
Cricketers from Derbyshire
English cricketers
Lancashire Cricket Board cricketers